The Welterweight competition at the 2019 AIBA World Boxing Championships was held from 13 to 21 September 2019.

Schedule
The schedule was as follows:

All times are Yekaterinburg Time (UTC+5)

Results

Finals

Top half

Section 1

Section 2

Bottom half

Section 3

Section 4

References

External links
Draw

Welterweight